Majid Abd al-Amir Adir al-Attabi (born October 25, 1971), better known as Majid Al Mohandis, is an Iraqi singer and composer. His success in the Arab world has earned him the titles of "the Engineer of the Arabic song" and "Voice of Diamond".

Biography
Al Mohandis was born 25, October 1971 in Baghdad, Iraq. He studied Engineering in Baghdad, hence the nickname "Al Mohandis (المهندس)," which means "the engineer" in Arabic. He was raised in a large Muslim family, where he was diligent about work. Upon finishing his university studies, he maintained an interest in arts. Al Mohandis had always aspired to become a musician, despite his family's opposition and anger in the matter; he opposed his parents' desire, however, and finished his higher education besides his lifelong passion: Music. Majid even worked as a tailor for several years while chasing his artistic ambitions. It was then when he had bought himself his first 'oud to practice and evolve as a musician.

Personal life
He married a French woman with Tunisian descent, with whom he had his son Muhammed before divorce.

He was given Saudi citizenship by King Abdullah in 2010, while he retained his Iraqi citizenship—amid criticism from some Iraqis.

Discography
Albums:

 "Wahishni Moot" (2005)
 "Enjaneat" (2006)
 "Ensaa" (2008)
 "Ezkerini" (2009)
 "Layali Februrai" (2011)
 "Ana Wayyak" (2013)
 "Mohami" (2015)
 "Febrayer ElKuwait 2015" (2015)
 "Majid Almuhandis" (2015)
 "Akh Qalby" (2016)
 "Eldenya Dawaarah" (2018)
 "Shahd El Hourouf" (2020)
 "Wahish Al Denya" (2021)
 "Meshtaqelak" (2022)
 "Eateni Waqtan" (2022)

References

Living people
21st-century Saudi Arabian male singers
Iraqi emigrants to Saudi Arabia
Naturalised citizens of Saudi Arabia
Musicians from Baghdad
Rotana Records artists
1971 births
21st-century Iraqi male singers
Iraqi male film actors
Iraqi male television actors
Saudi Arabian male film actors
Saudi Arabian male television actors